Hughes Mountain and the Hughes Mountain State Natural Area are located  in southern Washington County, Missouri  (Sections 28 and 33, T36N R3E) just south of  the Big River and Highway M on Cedar Creek Road in the St. Francois Mountains range of The Ozarks.  The mountain reaches an elevation of just over 1,200 feet, rising 430 feet above the Big River.  The Hughes Mountain Natural Area of the Missouri Department of Conservation encompasses  of the mountain, including the rhyolite glade at its top.

History
The area around Hughes Mountain was first settled ca 1810 by John Hughes, his wife (Susannah) and their children, resulting in the mountain being named Hughes Mountain.  The mountain itself  remained public land until 1861 when purchased by John Hughes's son, Mahlon Hughes and afterwards remained  in the Hughes family until it was purchased by the Missouri Conservation Commission in 1982. At that time  it was designated a State Natural Area.

Hughes Mountain State Natural Area
Within the Hughes Mountain Natural Area is a glade with an outcrops of Precambrian rhyolite displaying columnar jointing, and designated the Devil's Honeycomb. Devil's Honeycomb is listed in the book, Geographic Wonders and Curiosities of Missouri. The natural area is divided between forest land (about 2/3 the total area) containing three types of forests, and glades (about 1/3 the total area).

Flora and fauna
The forest contains mainly post oaks, white oaks, stunted blackjack oaks, eastern red cedar,  black hickory, farkleberry, winged elm, lowbush blueberry, service berry, red elm, sassafras, winged sumac and aromatic sumac.  The glade flora includes rushfoil, rough buttonweed, broomsedge, poverty grass, yellow star grass,  little bluestem, flame flowers, prickly pear cactus,  spider wort, wild hyacinth, lance leaf coreopsis, pine-weed and a variety of lichen. Fauna species include two species of lizards, fence and collared, lichen grasshoppers, and prairie warblers.

Geology

Hughes Mountain is a peak in the St. Francois Mountains Range of southeastern Missouri.  These granite and rhyolite rocks of these mountains formed 1.485 billion years ago during the Proterozoic Eon when the area was volcanically active.  Hughes Mountain is formed of extrusive rhyolite which fractured into vertical joints when it cooled, creating polygonal columns.  These columns have from four to six sides and are up to three feet (0.91 m) tall.  When viewed from above they resemble a honeycomb.

Columnar jointing is not limited to rhyolite formations. The Devils Honeycomb is a smaller example of the sort of columnar jointing found at Devils Tower National Monument in Wyoming,  Devils Postpile National Monument in California, and the Giant's Causeway near Bushmills,  Northern Ireland.

Notes

References
 Missouri Department of Conservation—Missouri Dept. of Natural Resources, Natural Area Nomination Form 1982
 Geologic Wonders and Curiosities of Missouri,    By Thomas Robinson Beveridge, Missouri Division of Geology and Land Survey, 1978,  pgs 18-20
 The Missouri Conservationist, Vol. 48 No. 8 September 1987, pgs 10-14, article by Richard Thom

External links

  
 
 
 

St. Francois Mountains
Conservation Areas of Missouri
Mountains of Missouri
Protected areas established in 1982
Rock formations of Missouri
Landforms of Washington County, Missouri
Mountains of Washington County, Missouri
Felsic intrusions
1982 establishments in Missouri
Proterozoic volcanism
Volcanism of Missouri